Tomislav Ternar (born 16 September 1990 in Murska Sobota) is a Slovenian tennis player.

Davis Cup

Singles performances (1-0)

External links
 
 
 

Slovenian male tennis players
Living people
People from Murska Sobota
1990 births
People from Beltinci
Mediterranean Games gold medalists for Slovenia
Competitors at the 2009 Mediterranean Games
Competitors at the 2013 Mediterranean Games
Mediterranean Games medalists in tennis